Marcel Ghanem (born 1964) is a Lebanese journalist. He hosted the widely popular Lebanese political talk show "Kalam El-Nas" and now he is hosting another Lebanese political talk show "Sar el Waqt".

Early years

Ghanem was born in Yahchouch, Lebanon in 1964. He graduated from Lebanese University with a Bachelor of Laws degree in 1987. He then practiced as an attorney between 1987 and 1994.

Career

Ghanem presented a political talk show on the Lebanese Broadcasting Corporation (LBC) and Radio Liban Libre from 1991 to 1993. The program was called Kalam Massoul (Talking Responsibly?) , co-hosted by journalist May Chidiac.

From 1995 until 29 March 2018, Ghanem hosted the talk show Kalam El Nass (What people are saying) on LBC.  He left LBC after receiving an offer from MTV. His new show on MTV is "Sar El Wa'et" (It's About Time) and has been on air since October 2018.

Giving a media platform to provocative speeches
During the 2017 Lebanon–Saudi Arabia dispute crisis, Marcel Ghanem hosted in his political talk show Kalam El-Nas Saudi journalists who attacked the Lebanese Armed Forces and accused the president of Lebanon, the Speaker of the Parliament of Lebanon and the Minister of Foreign Affairs and Emigrants of Lebanon as terrorists.

References

External links
  Official Website

Lebanese journalists
Lebanese Maronites
Living people
1964 births
Lebanese television presenters
Lebanese University alumni
People from Keserwan District